The Andean mountain cavy (Microcavia niata) is a species of rodent in the family Caviidae. It is found in Bolivia, Chile and Peru.

Feeding 
The Andean mountain cavy's diet consists of herbs typically of the genus Eleocharis, Distichlis, Verbena, and Deyeuxia, which are common in bog areas, which suggest that this species of Microcavia only live in bog areas.

Characteristics 
The Andean mountain cavy is usually seen with fur described as pale and soft, with yellow undertones. The dorsal hairs are multicoloured with a grey base, a dark grey middle and yellow tip. The back hairs are measured around 16-18mm and the animals cheeks, throat and belly are white with a grey base.

References

Cavies
Mammals of the Andes
Mammals of Bolivia
Mammals of Chile
Mammals described in 1898
Taxa named by Oldfield Thomas
Taxonomy articles created by Polbot